Hank Simms (May 25, 1923 – August 7, 2013) was a voice actor and announcer, best known for narrating the opening credits of Quinn Martin TV shows, including The F.B.I., Barnaby Jones, Cannon and The Streets of San Francisco.  He was also hired to imitate his distinctive announcing style in the opening credits for the satirical TV series Police Squad!.

References

External links

American male voice actors
1923 births
2013 deaths
Male actors from Tulsa, Oklahoma